Luis Almonte (born January 19, 1963) is a Dominican  record producer, audio engineer, mixing engineer, multi-instrumentalist, and songwriter. His production, songwriting, and mixing credits include Miguelito,  single, which won the 2008 Grammy Award for Grammy Award for Best Latin Urban Album.

Early life
Almonte was born and raised in En Villa Fundacion, Bani Provincia Peravia in Dominican Republic.

Discography

Producer and writer discography

References

External links

American record producers
Living people
1963 births
Dominican Republic musicians
People from Baní